The 13 municipalities of the North Karelia Region in Finland are divided on three sub-regions: 


Joensuu sub-region 
Heinävesi
Ilomantsi (Ilomants)
Joensuu
Juuka (Juga)
Kontiolahti (Kontiolax)
Liperi (Libelits)
Outokumpu
Polvijärvi

Central Karelia sub-region 
Kitee (Kides)
Rääkkylä
Tohmajärvi

Pielinen Karelia sub-region 
Lieksa
Nurmes

See also 
Eastern Finland
Regions of Eastern Finland

References

External links